Irina Konstantinovna Kakhovskaya (15 August 1887, Tarashcha, Kiev Governorate – 1 March 1960, Maloyaroslavets, Kaluga Oblast) was a Russian revolutionary, a representative of the Left Socialist-Revolutionaries, organizer of the assassination of the commander of the occupation forces in Ukraine, Field Marshal Hermann von Eichhorn in 1918, grandniece of the Decembrist Pyotr Kakhovsky.

Biography
She was born into the family of a land surveyor and a national teacher. From 28 August 1897 to 25 May 1903, she studied at the Mariinsky Institute for Orphans of Noble Birth in Saint Petersburg, from which she graduated with a silver medal. Then she entered the historical and philological department of the Women's Pedagogical Institute.

Since 1905, she was carried away by revolutionary ideas after she heard the speech of Maxim Gorky. Thanks to her acquaintance with Alexandra Kollontai, for some time she supported the ideas of social democracy and briefly sided with the Bolsheviks in Saint Petersburg, becoming secretary of their local district organisation. Soon Kakhovskaya changed her views and joined the far-left Union of Socialist Revolutionary Maximalists. In the summer of 1906, she carried on revolutionary propaganda among the peasants in the villages of the Samara Governorate.

On 28 April 1907 she was first arrested in St. Petersburg by the Okhrana. The St. Petersburg Military District Court on 7 March 1908 sentenced her to hard labour for a period of 20 years. When the verdict was approved, the term was reduced to 15 years. She served her sentence first in the Novinsky Women's Prison in Moscow, then was sent to the Maltsev Prison of the Nerchinsk katorga in Transbaikal, where she arrived on 16 July 1908. The famous Shesterka, the "Six" Socialist Revolutionary women  (Maria Spiridonova, Anastasia Bitsenko, Revekka Fialka, Lydia Yezerskaya, Maria Shkolnik) were already in the Nerchinsk katorga: their slow train journey across Russia in 1906 had lasted around a month and turned into a kind of triumphal progress. She formed a special friendship with Spiridonova and Izmailovich, a bond of political and personal sisterhood that would last throughout their lives.

Kakhovskaya described the prison situation as follows:

To support her daughter, Kakhovskaya's mother moved to Siberia, illegally handing letters to political convicts. In 1914, Irina Kakhovskaya was amnestied, but remained in Transbaikal, where she collaborated with Maria Spiridonova in the creation of the Chita Committee of the Party of Socialist Revolutionaries after the outbreak of the  1917 February Revolution. In May they both traveled from Siberia to Moscow along with other former prison companions to attend the party 3rd National Congress. They were greeted with ovations, but none of them were elected to the governing Central Committee. In the aftermath of the October Revolution Kakhovskaya participated in the secession of the Left Socialist-Revolutionaries from their old party, and represented them in the presidium of the Second All–Russian Congress of Soviets.

After the Central Committee of the new party resolved to resume the "terrorist fight" against the implementation of the Treaty of Brest-Litovsk in 1918, Irina Kakhovskaya and her friend and party comrade Boris Donskoy were tasked with preparing an attempt on the life of Field Marshal Hermann von Eichhorn, who led the German military occupation in Ukraine, as well as on puppet Hetman Pavlo Skoropadskyi's. During June, Kakhovskaya and Donskoy conducted surveillance, trying to establish the most successful time and place for the murder of the German Marshal, who was considered a ruthless tyrant. It was decided that Donskoy would kill him. The historian Margaret Maxwell wrote that for a Narodnik-inspired revolutionary murder was regarded as a possible tragic necessity that could desirably be atoned for by the revolutionary's own death. On 30 July, Donskoy met a stranger who asked to show him the direction to the residence of General Eichhorn. Donskoy followed him, after a while there was an explosion: Eichhorn was killed. Kakhovskaya decided to fulfill the order to the end and kill the hetman, which was scheduled for the funeral of the German General, but Skoropadsky left the funeral before her arrival. After the failure, Kakhovskaya with two comrades went to spend the night in a country house, where she was ambushed by the Germans. She was tortured and interrogated and then sent to prison and sentenced to death. While awaiting the approval of the verdict by the Kaiser, she spent several months in the German Commandant's Office at the Lukyanovskaya Prison. During her imprisonment, the November Revolution began in Germany, but she was only released on 24 January 1919, after several campaigns in support of her liberation.

In 1919, she was arrested by the Cheka, but was released two months later thanks to the intervention of Lenin, as it became known that she was plotting the assassination of General Denikin, an enemy of both parties. Denikin's assassination never took place due to the fact that her assistants fell ill with typhus. In Rostov, where the attempt was to take place, Irina continued to promote the ideas of Left Socialist Revolutionaries.

After arriving in Moscow, she too suffered from typhus and was arrested again at the beginning of 1921: despite the fact that she was already sitting in Butyrka prison during the Kronstadt rebellion, she was found guilty of complicity in it and sentenced to exile in Kaluga in 1922.

In 1923 her memoir of the attacks on Eichorn and Denikin appeared in Berlin and was later translated into French and published in Paris with a foreword by Romain Rolland.

In March 1925, Kakhovskaya was arrested yet again under the charge not only of trying to revive the left–wing Socialist Revolutionary organization in Kaluga, but also of ideological leadership of the student organization "Revolutionary Avant–Garde". A special session at the Collegium of the Joint State Political Directorate (OGPU) condemned Kakhovskaya to 3 years in a concentration camp with a replacement for expulsion to Vyatka for the same period. But at the request of Ekaterina Peshkova, instead of Vyatka, she was sent to Stavropol on the Volga, and from there she was transferred to Samarkand, where she joined up with Maria Spiridonova and Alexandra Izmailovich, who were previously exiled there. Their term of exile having been extended, in 1928 Kakhovskaya, Izmailovich and Spiridonova moved to Tashkent, where they earned a living by technical translations from English, and gave private lessons.

In the early 1930s, they were re-arrested and exiled to Ufa, where they formed a sort of commune, also including Spiridonova's husband, his invalid father and teenaged son, and Kakhovskaya's elderly aunt. In February 1937, the whole group was hauled in by the NKVD and detained for several months under the charge of havig attempted to create a united counterrevolutionary centre and having carried out terrorist acts against the Communist leaders of Bashkiria. While they were held and subjected to harsh interrogations, however, "the entire Bashkir government itself was arrested, so charges of plots against Stalin and Politburo member Klementi Voroshilov were substituted." On 25 December 1937, in a closed session of the Military Collegium of the Supreme Court of the Soviet Union on the fabricated case of the All–Union Socialist Revolutionary Center, Kakhovskaya was sentenced to 10 years in prison. Izmailovich was also sentenced to 10 years, Spiridonova to 25. According to Kakhovskaya's report, her own hearing lasted no longer than seven minutes.  All three refused either to confess anything or to accuse anybody. Mayorov alone was forced into tearfully signing a guilty confession under the threat of sentencing his sick father and young son to hard labour. Izmailovich, Spiridonova and Mayorov were to be executed by order of Stalin in 1941 in the Medvedevsky Forest massacre

After a short stay in the Yaroslavl and Vladimir prisons, in 1939, Kakhovskaya was sent to the Krasnoyarsk Camp, where for 7 years she worked exclusively in general work: forestry and agricultural work. She was released in February 1947, lived in Kansk, where she was last arrested in early January 1948, was held in the Krasnoyarsk Prison, after which in 1949, she was returned to Kansk as an exile. In total, she spent forty–five years in prison and exile. In 1954, she was released from exile, in 1955, she moved to Maloyaroslavets, where she was engaged, among other things, in translating the fairy tale by Antoine de Saint-Exupéry The Little Prince (unpublished).

In 1957, she was rehabilitated in the 1937 case, as was Izmailovich, but steadfast Kakhovskaya kept insisting in vain on the full rehabilitation of both her slain comrades. In November 1958, at the age of 71, she would have a memoir she called Notes and Explanations ("Zapiski i Zaiavleniia") sent on to the Central Committee of the Communist party, to the Council of Ministers, and to the Office of the Public Prosecutor, with the sole aim of keeping alive the memory of her comrades' late years. It was mainly her credit that this memory was not completely lost. Notwithstanding, Alexandra Izmailovich was fully rehabilitated only in 1989, and "not until 1990 were the 1941 charges against Spiridonova rescinded [...] Finally, in 1992, [she] was exonerated of the charges for which she had been imprisoned and exiled beginning in 1918, and was fully rehabilitated." The exact burial place of the Medvedevsky Forest victims has never been found.

Kakhovskaya died in Maloyaroslavets in 1960 from liver cancer.

Family
Father – Konstantin Kakhovsky (? – 1890).

Mother – Augusta Fedorovna.

Memories of Irina Kakhovskaya
The theorist of Socialist Revolutionary Maximalism Grigory Nestroev wrote:

Selected works

I. Kakhovskaya:

 Previously distributed as samizdat, it was later reported, in an abridged English translation entitled "Our Fate", in )

References

Sources

1887 births
1960 deaths
Soviet translators
Russian translators
20th-century translators
Translators from French
Left socialist-revolutionaries
Russian memoirists
Soviet rehabilitations
Deaths from liver cancer
Female revolutionaries